The 143rd Airlift Wing (143 AW) is a unit of the Rhode Island Air National Guard, stationed at Quonset Point Air National Guard Station, Rhode Island. If activated to federal service, the Wing is gained by the United States Air Force Air Mobility Command.

The 143rd Airlift Squadron assigned to the Wings 143rd Operations Group, is a descendant organization of the 152nd Observation Squadron, established on 21 August 1939. It is one of the 29 original National Guard Observation Squadrons of the United States Army National Guard formed before World War II.

Mission
The 143rd Airlift Wing's purpose is to provide airlift and combat support forces to the United States Armed Forces and to provide resources to protect life, property and public safety for its state and community.

Units
The 143rd Airlift Wing consists of the following units:
 143rd Operations Group
 143rd Airlift Squadron
 143rd Maintenance Group
 143rd Mission Support Group
 143rd Medical Group

History
Established on 1 July 1968 when the Rhode Island Air National Guard 143rd Special Operations Squadron was authorized to expand to a group level. The 143rd Special Operations Group was established by the National Guard Bureau, with the 143rd SOS becoming the group's flying squadron. Other squadrons assigned into the group were the 143rd Headquarters, 143rd Material Squadron (Maintenance), 143rd Combat Support Squadron, and the 143rd USAF Dispensary.

The Grumman SA-16 Albatross flown by 143rd pilots since 1955 was replaced in 1968 with an updated version of the Albatross, the HU-16. With twice the cargo capability and range, the HU-16 opened up new avenues of opportunity as was demonstrated in 1970. Flight and Ground crews of the 143rd assisted scientists and engineers of the Naval Underwater Systems Center, conducting studies of undersea acoustics, at Lake Tanganyika in Africa during April and again in August at Hudson Bay, Canada.

The unit would work in the Special Operations field for seven more years, during which the HU-16 aircraft were eventually retired in 1972 and replaced with Fairchild C-119G/L "Flying Boxcars".

Tactical airlift
In 1975 as part of a general program to upgrade Air National Guard units the 143rd was redesignated as a Tactical Airlift Group and assigned Lockheed C-130A Hercules aircraft. In 1980 the 143rd Tactical Airlift Group moved from T.F. Green airport to its new home at Quonset Air National Guard Base.

As global airlifters, Rhode Island "Herks" were found in all parts of the United States, Europe, Africa, South America and the Caribbean. The 143rd played a vital role in deployments such as Volant Oak, Volant Pine, Red Flag, Dragon Hammer, Volant Rodeo competitions and humanitarian efforts such as "Operation Toy Lift" which provided toys to the children of Granada on 1986. In 1989, the 143rd was selected for conversion to the C-130E Model.

In 1990 unit volunteers provided support during Operation Desert Shield. In September, unit members flew out of Rhein-Main Air Base, Germany to support operational missions from Turkey and Saudi Arabia. The second group of volunteers arrived at RAF Mildenhall, England in January 1991 and was in the theater of operations when Operation Desert Shield turned into Operation Desert Storm. With the defeat of the Iraqi forces and the end of the Gulf War, members returned home in June 1991 and were released from active duty.

As part of Air Mobility Command the unit continued to be called upon to support State, Federal, and UN activities throughout the world. Volunteers from the 143rd participated in many United Nations relief missions; Somalia in 1992, Operation Provide Promise in 1993 flying daylight air-land missions into Sarajevo along with night airdrops over remote areas of Bosnia-Herzegovina.

On 1 October 1995 the group was elevated to Wing status. In 1998 the Air Force formed the Expeditionary Air Force (EAF); smaller sized war fighting "packages" able to rapidly respond to regional conflicts. The Wing has participated in five AEF cycles, supporting Operation Joint Forge in the Balkans, Operation Southern Watch in Southwest Asia and Coronet Oak in South America.

Current operations
On 11 September 2001, the 143rd responded to the call again, deploying unit members to Ground Zero, to US bases for homeland security and implemented 24-hour operations at Quonset. The 143rd AW has supported the Global War on Terror by not only becoming a bridge to and from the theater but by also providing airlift in support of the war effort. The 143rd AW provided the 1st ever C-130J Aircraft in a combat role by the U.S. Air Force in December 2004 and continued to support the war effort with both the C-130E and C-130J until retiring the C-130E in 2005. The 143rd AW also provided and continues to provide the much needed troop support within Southwest Asia and many other areas of the world.

In December 2001, the 143rd received its first C-130J-30. The Wing became the first in the Air Force to receive the "stretch" version of the "J" model. As the most modern tactical airlifter in the world, the C-130J-30 can carry more cargo or personnel farther, faster, and more economically than the C-130E proving its increased airlift capability. The fleet for the 143rd was completed with the arrival of the eighth J-model at Quonset on 15 June 2007.

Lineage
 Established as 143rd Special Operations Group, and activated, 1 July 1968
 Re-designated: 143rd Tactical Airlift Group, 1 October 1975
 Status changed from Group to Wing, 1 October 1995
 Re-designated: 143rd Airlift Wing, 1 October 1995

Assignments
 Rhode Island Air National Guard, 1 July 1968 – Present
 Gained by: Tactical Air Command
 Gained by: Military Airlift Command, 1 December 1974
 Gained by: Air Mobility Command, 1 June 1992

Components
 143rd Operations Group, 1 October 1995 – Present
 143rd Airlift Squadron, 1 July 1968 – 19 October 1995
 Assigned to 143 OG effective 1 October 1995

Stations
 Theodore Francis Green Airport, Rhode Island, 1 July 1968
 Quonset State Airport, Rhode Island, 1 October 1980
 Designated: Quonset Point Air National Guard Station, Rhode Island, 1991-Present.

Aircraft 

 U-10D Super Courier, 1968–1975
 HU-16 Albatross, 1968–1972
 C-119 Flying Boxcar, 1972–1975

 C-130A Hercules, 1975–1989
 C-130E Hercules, 1989–2005
 C-130J-30, 2004–Present

References

 Rogers, B. (2006). United States Air Force Unit Designations Since 1978. 
 Globalsecurity.org 143rd Airlift Group
 143rd Airlift Wing Factsheet

External links
 Rhode Island Air National Guard
 143AW FactSheet

Wings of the United States Air National Guard
North Kingstown, Rhode Island
0143
Military units and formations in Rhode Island